Chinawal is a village in the Jalgaon district of Maharashtra state, India. It is situated at the foothills of the Satpura range in a generally hot and dry climate. The densely populated village is surrounded by the flat land and nutrient-rich black soil.

The flora and fauna of Chinawal have been impacted by the human habitation and cultivation of the land, but non-human life like neem trees, tree squirrels and graculas can still be found in and around the village. Using modern methods of the agriculture and agronomic practices, villagers of the Chinawal village have achieved a high growth rate of agriculture produce especially of bananas which is noted by the Government of Maharashtra and various other institutions.

Chinawal is also known for its educational facilities. It has Marathi, Urdu and English medium schools which offer education from the kindergarten up to higher secondary school, and which is facilitated by the students' accommodations and school buses.

The 'vangyache bharit' loving villagers also favor urad dal, shev bhaji, puran poli and kheer in their dishes.

Geography 
It has an average elevation of 246 metres (810 feet) from the sea level. It is situated at the foothills of Satpura range which is in the north-east region of Deccan Traps and Khandesh. Landscape surrounding village is approximately flat, free of dikes and hills. The loam to clayey soil is of volcanic origin which contain poor to moderate organic carbon and nitrogen, poor amount of phosphorus and high to very high amount of potassium. Level of soil salinity and alkalinity is very low, hence non-agricultural land is almost non-existent. Such volcanic ash rich soil is well-suited for the cultivation of cotton and banana crops. Naturally occurring neem trees are often grown in controlled way for the shade in hot summer. Landscape of Chinawal village, street sides and borders of the farm lands are chiefly dotted with these neem trees.

Administration 
Since the establishment of the gram panchayat in 1936, Chinawal village has seen notable progress. The entire village is electrified. Shikshan Prasarak Mandal has built many school buildings and hostels. The village has excelled in banana production, which warranted the visit of Kerala government officials in 2004 to Chinawal during their study tour. In August 2011, many farmers from the villages of Yamunanagar and Kernal districts in Haryana visited the Chinawal village on behalf of the government of Haryana to study its agricultural production.

In April 2013, Chinawal village received an award under 'Mahatma Gandhi Tantamukt Gaon Mohim' (Mahatma Gandhi Dispute-Free Village Mission) for the year 2011-12 from the government of Maharashtra. But some general issues remains. In 2012, Jalgaon district health officials had declared water from 36 villages as 'unsafe for drinking', which included drinking water sample from the Chinawal village. Reason given by the health officials was general unhygienic conditions in and around villages which included mixing of the animal and human waste in drinking water supply chain due to lack of cleanliness and open defecation, excess use of fertilizers in the farms etc. Illegal sale of Alcoholic beverages, including country wine, is rampant in and around Chinawal village even on dry days and some time teenagers are employed to smuggle wine bottles.

The job of road construction and repair falls under zilla parishad. Despite repeated complaints to the representatives of the Raver region, the condition of roads leading to Chinawal and other villages remains poor and it impacts transport of the banana production and overall economy of the village. The job of electricity supply falls under the Government of Maharashtra. Villagers and farmers suffers due to many hours of daily power loadshedding. Farmers can not irrigate their farms regularly and it affects agricultural production. Sometime sand is illegally smuggled from the bed of the Suki river which is near to the Chinawal village, but when it is legally sold, gram panchayat of the Chinawal village do not receive its 10% share in the income regularly from the state government and it affects the development work of the village.

Health 
The village has a Primary Health Centre and ambulance run by the state government. It is well-maintained and hence in February 2006 it was nominated for Maharashtra state level Anandibai Joshi Awards for meritorious services in public health. But the village has no private hospital with modern facilities for emergency treatment. In 2013, Maharashtra state govt has launched Rajiv Gandhi Jeevandayee Arogya Yojana for free medicare to poor people of the state of Maharashtra. Under this scheme, people receive free treatment in the selected hospitals at district places for 975 types of diseases and surgeries and govt bears cost of it up to Rs.1,50,000 per year per family. Poor villagers of the Chinawal village go to these hospitals at Jalgaon city to avail this facility. Govt arranges health camps all over the Jalgaon district from time to time and villagers take free treatment at any such nearest health camp.

Elections 
Gram panchayat elections

17 gram panchayat members were elected in the December 2012 elections
 Surekha Narendra Patil
 Shaikh Kalim Shaikh Nyajuddin
 Manish Sharad Borole
 Jayashri Nitin Patil
 Chandrashekhar Sudhakar Kirange
 Manisha Sunil Bhalerao
 Sanjivani Sharad Bonde
 Chandrakant Dongar Bhangale
 Rekha Jitendra Nemade
 Begum Sandu Tadavi
 Suresh Girdhar Garase
 Vinod Pundlik Bavaskar
 Shaikh Azgar Shaikh Siraj
 Gauri Yogesh Bangale
 Yogesh Suresh Borole
 Madhuri Yuvraj Mahajan
 Asha Kamlakar Nemade

Panchayat samiti and Zilla parishad

Demographics 

As per the 1951 Census of India, the population of the Chinawal village was 4720 with 977 households. The jurisdictional area of the village was spread over 5.3 sq. miles (13.73 km2). The livelihood of 3866 villagers was agriculture-dependent.

From 1951 to 2011, the population of Chinawal increased by about 250%. As per the 2011 census of India, the population of the village is 11,747. The village has total of 2738 households with 6180 males and 5567 females, which corresponds to a sex ratio of 901 females for every 1000 males, which is lower than the national average sex ratio of 940. 1403 persons of the village were between age group 0–6 years, 751 boys and 652 girls. Excluding these children which were yet to take admissions in the school, the average literacy rate of the village is 84.25%, which is above the national average literacy rate of 74.04%. In the village, 89.13% males are literate while 78.86% females are literate. Most villagers belong to a caste called Leva Patil. 1335 villagers are from scheduled caste, while 618 villagers are from scheduled tribe. Out of 4,311 working villagers, 840 villagers own cultivating land, 2347 villagers are involved in agriculture work, while 1124 villagers are involved in other work. 7,436 villagers are non-workers. The area of the village is approx 1.05 square km and hence the density of the population is approx 11,000 per square km. The major population of the village is concentrated in eastside old village, in the colonies like Wani Galli, Pehed Wada, Ram Mandir Wada, Garse Wada, Pathan Wada, Tadvi Wada, Musalman Wada, Chinch Wada, Mahadev Wada, Mahajan Wada, Bonde Wada etc. Westside new Chinawal village is well-planned and Tukaram Wadi, Rozoda Road, Hospital Road, Bouddha Wada; these colonies are comparatively thinly populated. Chinawal is the most populous village among 114 villages and towns of the Raver tehsil and there are only two towns in the Raver tehsil, Raver and Savda. Sarpanch of the Chinawal village is Yogesh Borole.

Religion 

The population of the village is predominantly theist. Philosophically the Hindu villagers believe in one god, but in practice the spiritual energy of the villagers is distributed in worshipping many deities and saints. In some corner of every Hindu home, a small temple (devghar/devhara) containing deities or photos of the deities can be found. If there is not enough space for the miniature temple, photos/deities are kept on a small wooden stool or fixed on a wall. Choice of the deities varies from home to home, but popular deities are Lakshmi, Shiva-Parvati, Vithoba, Saptashrungi, Ganesha, and Dattatreya.

The old tradition of long daily prayers with rituals has somewhat become extinct, though it is followed during the festivals and on special occasions. In daily prayers, people simply light a diya and incense sticks and pray with folded hands for a few minutes before continuing their work. The village has Ram mandir, Maruti mandir, Mahadev mandir and other temples. Some villagers go to one of these temples daily for prayer, others visit only during the festivals and on special occasions. Muslim villagers offer namaz daily and most of them fast during the month of Ramzan.

The social evil of untouchability, which once plagued Chinawal village like any other village in India, has ended here, and those inhuman visuals have become a thing of the past. The Bara Balutedar system has also ended, and now any individual, irrespective of his caste, is free to do any work in the village or anywhere in India, though some villagers still prefer their centuries-old hereditary occupation if they find that it is convenient and profitable. There is no discrimination in public life on the basis of caste, but caste still plays an important role in personal lives of villagers, and intercaste marriages are very rare.

Not only the caste system, but a centuries-old belief system is crumbling. A Brahman priest does not enjoy the same influence he would have had 200 years ago. Schools teach rational thinking and science, not traditional religious rituals and stories of gods or saints. TV has reached almost every home. The collective result of this is that many old traditions have either disappeared or receive less importance. Occurrences of pravachan, bhajan, and kirtan are on the decline. Every field used to have some presiding deity in the corner of field. That practice has largely disappeared, except for some small temples in a few fields or on the side of the road. The cruel practice of animal sacrifice in front of deities has become extinct long ago. Most of the 16 samskara rituals prescribed in the Hinduism are also long extinct. Some rituals like piercing ears and upanayana recorded in recent history are rarely seen now.

Not only rituals, but some deities have also disappeared. The tiger deity Waghoba and cobra deity Nagoba have disappeared, as the danger from tigers has ceased to exist and danger from snakes has become very rare. The buffalo deity Mhasoba also disappeared when the dominant occupation of the villagers changed from herding to farming.

In this disappearing act of traditions and rituals, some traditions have remained constant, and some new rituals have emerged and gained popularity. Rituals of firecrackers, electric lighting, and greeting cards were added to the Vijayadashami-Diwali celebrations during the last few hundred years. Ganesh Chaturthi was an important household celebration before 1894, but now it has been transformed into a big public celebration with erected pandals on the streets, music and dance. In the last few decades, Navratri has also turned into a big celebration like Ganesh Chaturthi. The Holi celebration in the village was almost nonexistent just three or four decades ago, except for lighting holika at a few places. But now teenagers can be seen celebrating and playing with colors. Other festivals like Krishna Janmashtami, Gudhi Padva, Rama Navami, Hanuman Jayanti, and Raksha Bandhan are celebrated with traditional religious fervor, but do not receive much attention from the younger generation, while Hartalika, Akshay Tritiya, Vat Purnima, Nag Panchami, Kojagiri Purnima, Makar Sankranti, and Maha Shivaratri are celebrated in a subdued manner. Some festivals like Pitru Paksha, Pithori Amavasya/Pola Tulsi Vivah, Rotpuja, Kakarpuja, and the tradition of observing fast on days like Ekadashi are falling into oblivion.

Most of the Muslims in Jalgaon district were originally Hindus from the Maharashtra and north India who, voluntarily or under force, converted to Islam during a period spread over centuries. A few of them are descendants of the Arabs who arrived in the Khandesh region to serve the Faruqi dynasty during 1370-1599. Leaving the past behind, they are all followers of the Islam religion, though the influence of the local culture can be seen in their food, clothes, and housing. Ramzan Eid, Bakri Eid and Eid-e-Milad are the biggest festivals of the Muslims. On Ramzan Eid, it is a tradition of the Muslims to send Sheer khurma for their Hindu friends. Some rich Muslims buy clothes for poor Hindus and this tradition has been maintained over centuries, barring the period of some occasional disturbances in the communal harmony of the village. An azaan is sounded daily by a muzim five times a day from the turret of a masjid as a call to assemble for the namaz. Along with daily namaz, some Muslims also worship Pir Baba. Every Muslim aspires to become a hajji by paying visit to the Mecca in his lifetime. Dalits are emancipated from centuries old oppression in the society because of great efforts from B. R. Ambedkar and as a mark of respect, his birth anniversary, Ambedkar Jayanti, is celebrated like a festival. During the last few decades, statues and photos of Dr. Ambedkar, along with the dhamma flag, have gained immense cultural significance in the landscape of the village.

The Ram Mandir in the Chinawal village was built in around 1863. Its property is the cause of dispute between Shri Ram Mandir Charitable Trust Chinawal and some villagers. A court case regarding this property dispute has been going on for many decades.

Transport 
Chinawal village is well connected to the nearby villages and cities by MSRTC buses and auto rickshaws through 8 roads, which are Chinawal-Waghoda road, Chinawal-Kochur road, Chinawal-Rozoda road, Chinawal-Khiroda road, Chinawal-Savkheda road, Chinawal-Kumbharkheda road, Chinawal-Utkheda road and Chinawal-Vadgaon road. Shahada - Raver Maharashtra State High Way Number 4 is 3 km south of the Chinawal village near Waghoda village. The nearest railway station is 30 km away at Bhusawal city. Tahsil place Raver is at 18 km, while district place Jalgaon is at approx 56 km away from the village. State capital Mumbai is 400 km southwest of the Chinawal village.

Economy 

The occupation of most villagers is agriculture. Out of 4311 working villagers, 3187 are involved in agriculture-related work and 1124 are involved in other work. More than 60% of the money circulation in the village depends upon agricultural produce.

Around 1890, a farmer at the Waghoda (Waghode) village, which is 3 km south of Chinawal, found a Roman coin while ploughing his field. The coin was of a rare variety and was in very fine condition. It belonged to the period of Roman emperor Septimius Severus (193 A.D.-211 A.D.). A October 1904 paper published in Journal of the Royal Asiatic Society discussed that the Roman Empire had a cotton trade with the cotton-growing eastern districts of the Dekhan region of India, which Waghoda and Chinawal villages are parts of.

Chinawal village and Jalgaon district are known for banana production, but this wasn't always the case. The 16th century Ain-i-Akbari written by Abul Fazl discusses the economy of the Khandesh region in detail, but does not mention banana cultivation It is not known with certainty when banana cultivation started in the Jalgaon district, but the Gazetteer of the Bombay Presidency (Vol II, Book IV, Part II, Page 176) written in 1880 made the following observation regarding banana cultivation in the Khandesh:
 During the British period, Chinawal village was known for handloom weaving and quality cloth production, not for banana production. Page 229 of the British gazette made the following observation:

The master weaver was used to supply yarn to handloom weavers in the Chinawal village and used to take ready clothes from the villagers to sell in weekly bazaars, shops, and fairs. The gazette made the following observation regarding the life of handloom weavers:

The gazette also noted that the textile machinery introduced by the Europeans in the Indian market had resulted in unequal competition and consequently villagers were losing their livelihood.

Banana 
The main crops grown by the farmers are bananas and cotton, with priority given to the banana. Kharif crops are harvested during the monsoon season. Water for rabi crops comes from wells. In the decades running up to 1990, flood irrigation was extensively used, due to which the water level in the wells dropped to an alarming level. Because of awareness programmes run by the farmer Vasantrao Mahajan, social worker Digambar Narkheda and Jain Irrigation Systems, farmers have started using agronomic practices, soil testing, drip irrigation, and fertigation to conserve water and increase productivity. These modern methods of cultivation were noted by a team of agriculture officers from the government of Kerala who visited Chinawal village in June 2004. 99% of the banana cultivation in Chinawal village is under drip irrigation, which has increased per-plant yield from 15 kg to nearly 30 kg, averaging 65 tonnes per hectare.

Bananas are cultivated on 72,000 hectares of land in Maharashtra, out of which the city of Raver's contribution is 22,000 hectares. This heavy production of bananas, including that from Chinawal village, is exported to north India by trucks and railway. Raver Tehsil has three railway stations exclusively for loading bananas.

Not everything goes smoothly. Farmers suffer loss due to a volatile market, damage to crops due to intense heat and storms, non-irrigation of farms due to frequent load shedding, plant diseases like karpa, and the poor condition of roads in and around Chinawal village. In 2012, the government recognized bananas as 'fruit' and extended weather-based crop insurance to banana crops, which is now helping the farmers to bear the losses. But an uncertain market for bananas remains the concern. In 1992, due to the Ayodhya dispute, recession struck the industry very hard and farmers had to destroy their banana crops, while in May 2014 the market price of banana fluctuated between 625-1000 per quintal. Some farmers take loans from banks, co-operative societies, and friends for the cultivation of bananas, but often they can't repay loans and are pushed into poverty. Despite these uncertainties, some better informed farmers like Vasantrao Mahajan and Dnyandeo Mahajan have successfully cultivated bananas for many decades.

Other 
After the banana, priority is given to the cultivation of cotton, gahu and jwari. In pulses, first priority is given to harbhara, followed by udid daal toor daal, bhui mug and mung daal, while teel, maka, soybean, bajri are also favorite crops of the farmers. Cultivation of rice is non-existent in the Chinawal village. Some farmers have started growing turmeric and potatoes as alternative crops to the banana.

Satpura range is 10 km away from the Chinawal village, so water from the Suki dam cannot reach through canals to the farms in Chinawal village. As a solution, eight water wells alongside the bank of the Suki River are artificially recharged by releasing water in the bed of the river. Filling of these water wells leads to increase in the water level of 600 water wells in Chinawal and other surrounding villages. This water is used for irrigating the farms.

All farmers of the Chinawal village cannot afford to buy modern agricultural machinery. Only a handful of farmers own tractors and threshers, which are rented to the other farmers. Tractos are used for the initial laborious work of tilling the hardened soil. Then later on, an ox-driven plough, is used for sowing and weed control.

Farmers keep part of their produce for their own consumption, some may be sold to other villagers, and then the surplus produce is sold in the Raver and Savda markets, both of which are less than 20 km away from the Chinawal village.

Other needs of the villagers like spices, oil, salt, stationery, and medicine are provided by the retail shopkeepers who buy these articles in wholesale from the neighbouring towns and sell it to the villagers. A bazaar is periodically held in Chinawal where small traders sell various commodities at negotiable rates. 973 villagers are involved in non-agriculture work to offer what farmers cannot produce. Their occupation includes domesticating dairy cattle like buffalos and cows for dairy products, retail stores, service and repairs, healthcare, hotels, tobacco selling etc. There are some very poor villagers who work as the agricultural labourers and they get work only during particular seasons. The government supports them with the food scheme Antyodaya Anna Yojana.

Education 

Schools in the village follow the 10+2+3 education pattern of Maharashtra. 1st to 5th standard education is called primary level education, 6th to 8th standard education is called upper primary level, and 9th to 10th standard education is called high school level. Schools conduct their own examinations up to 9th standard and in 11th standard, but at the end of 10th standard and 12th standard, the state level public examinations SSC and HSC are conducted. After getting their SSC or HSC certificate, students may opt to find jobs. For those who wish to continue their education after HSC, there are various options. They may continue their college level education for another 3 years (under the 10+2+3 pattern) to get degrees like B.Sc., B.Com., or B.A., or they may opt for other degree courses like B.E. or MBBS.

As per the Right of Children to Free and Compulsory Education Act passed in 2009, all children from 6–14 years are provided with free education. All the direct and indirect expenses of students, like textbooks, uniforms, and transportation are borne by the government. Two trained teachers are mandatory per 60 students. As per government rules, every school has 145 days of vacation in a year.

There are two primary schools in the Chinawal village for elementary education up to 4th standard in Marathi language medium: Zila Parishad boys' school and Zila Parishad girls' school. Primary education through English language medium is provided by the Nutan Prathamik Vidya Mandir school. Education from 5th standard up to 12th standard, HSC is provided by the Nutan Madhyamik Vidyalaya. Shikshan Prasarak Mandal has its own school buses to transport students from the nearby villages to the school. Hostel accommodation is provided to the students who comes from nearby small villages. A privately aided Urdu medium school - Khizar Urdu High School - was established in 1997 and is affiliated to MSBSHSE.

SSC and HSC exams are conducted at the Nutan Madhyamik Vidyalaya, where students studying at other schools in the nearby villages also come to give their exams. In the 2012 SSC result of Nutan Madhyamik Vidyalaya, 90% or 153 out of 170 students had cleared the SSC exam. In 2013, this percentage went up to 98.96% (190/192). In the 2014 SSC results, Nutan Madhyamik Vidyalaya maintained this record with a 99.49% (196/197) result. In 2015, this percentage stood at 99.53% (212/213). The passing out percentage of the Khijar Urdu High School in SSC exam was 36/57 or 63.16% in 2012, 45/53 or 84.91% in 2013, 43/45 or 95.56% in 2014 and 44/47 or 93.62% in 2015. In 2013, 206 out of 244 or 84.43% students who appeared for the HSC exam at Nutan Madhyamik Vidyalaya, had cleared the HSC exam, and in 2014, this percentage stood at 95.83 with 184 out of 192 students passing out. In 2015, this percentage stood at 95.90% with 257 out of 268 students passing out in HSC exam.

Shikshan Prasarak Mandal has recently started an industrial training institute at Chinawal. Work on the proposed D.Ed. college is in progress. Except Zila Parishad primary schools and Khijar Urdu High School, all educational facilities at Chinawal are run by the Shikshan Prasarak Mandal, Chinawal. The nearest college for graduation and post-graduation courses is Dhanaji Nana College at Faizpur which is 7 km away.

Culture

Dress 

In the dress of male Hindu villagers, the old fashion of white pheta, topi, dhoti, loose pyjamas, kurta,  (stole), barabandi, kopri, angarkha, and dagla has largely disappeared and it has been replaced with shirt, banyan, T-shirt and pants of different colors. In the dress of female Hindu villagers, the old fashion of nauvari sari/paatal, bangles, nathni and earring has largely disappeared and it has been replaced with sari, petticoat, blouse and salwar. The tradition of wearing mangalsutra remains, but the fashion of kunku has largely been replaced with bindi.

The dress of Muslim men is much like the dress of Hindu men, and can not be differentiated unless Muslims wear taqiyah and sherwani, and keep a beard. The dress of Muslim women is the hijab.

Food 

The Indian breads bhakri and poli are the villagers' main staple foods. Along with these breads, various types of bhaji are eaten. At weddings, festivals and special occasions, varan-poli (or varan-batti) and vangyachi bhaji (curry made of eggplant) are typically favored, while baigan bharta, vangyache bharit, brinjal bharit, eggplant bharit, udid dal curry, shev bhaji, pooran-poli and kheer are treated like banquet. Thecha-bhakri is eaten like fast food as it is easy to prepare and carry in the farms. Non-vegetarian villagers prefer goat meat over chicken. In general most of the dishes of the Maharashtrian cuisine are part of the villagers' dishes.

Sports 
Irrespective of caste and religion, children in the village play various games for physical development. Children from 4-10 play simple games like running around and tagging each other; rope swinging; imitating train, motorcycle and horse-riding; driving old bicycle tires on the streets; playing with marbles, and playing red hands. Older children play abadhabi, lapandav, aandhali kosimbir, bhavra, kite-flying, volleyball, badminton, and musical chairs. Skipping rope, hopscotch, fugdi,  and songtya (Indian version of backgammon) are popular games among the girls. Kho kho, kabaddi, viti-dandu, langdi, atya patya are traditional games played at school. Lately children have started favoring video games on cellphones and computers. Most of the traditional games are falling into disfavor and eventually all traditional games are overshadowed by cricket; many children can be seen playing cricket anywhere, even in small rooms.

The forms of entertainment have also changed in the village over the ages. Bhajan, kirtan, Bhagavad Gita parayan, pravachan, gondhal, bharud, jogwa, jatra, yatra, and dindi were major sources of entertainment for the villagers in bygone eras. Tamasha, lavani, and natak were favorites of the younger generation. After 1950, most of these were slowly replaced by the phonograph, radio, movie theater, audio cassette player, video cassette player, CD player, television, computer and cellphone. Bollywood films and TV have played a major role in transforming entertainment in the village. Remnants of the past can be still found in the form of an occasional bhajan, kirtan and parayan, but they are now performed for the religious purpose and not for the entertainment.

Something has remained constant over centuries: for some villagers, wine and tobacco are traditional sources of recreation.

Incidents 
Chinawal is generally a peaceful village, except for some incidents of disturbance. On 11 April 2011 at around 9 am, three robbers arrived on motorcycles at the Central Bank of India in Chinawal village. They masked their faces with clothes to hide their identity and entered the bank holding revolvers. They threatened bank employees and other people present. In the subsequent struggle, they injured a bank employee with a knife and then shot him. They stole around 1 million rupees from the safe of the bank and succeeded in escaping on motorcycles. The bank employee survived the gunshot, but the robbers were never caught.

.

In June 2010, a poster of Dr. Babasaheb Ambedkar was torn and in a subsequent riot, four police constables and two villagers were injured.

In September 2002, a minor riot broke out between the two communities of the village during the Ganesh visarjan procession, but no serious injuries or death were reported.

There are no dangerous wild animals or jungle surrounding the village. All the land is cultivated. In March 2011, farmers sighted a tiger in the farms of Chinawal village, which created much panic among the farmers. Forest officers tried to track the tiger by his pug-marks and GPS, but couldn't locate him.

References

External links 
 

Villages in Jalgaon district
Banana production